K20MM-D is a low-power digital television station in New Orleans, Louisiana, broadcasting locally on UHF channel 20 (virtual channel 47) as an owned-and-operated affiliate of HSN.

Digital television

References

External links

Television stations in New Orleans
Low-power television stations in the United States
Television channels and stations established in 1992
1992 establishments in Louisiana